Popular culture (also called mass culture or pop culture) is generally recognized by members of a society as a set of  practices, beliefs, artistic output (also known as, popular art or mass art) and objects that are dominant or prevalent in a society at a given point in time. Popular culture also encompasses the activities and feelings produced as a result of interaction with these dominant objects. The primary driving force behind popular culture is the mass appeal, and it is produced by what cultural analyst Theodor Adorno refers to as the "culture industry".

Heavily influenced in modern times by mass media, this collection of ideas permeates the everyday lives of people in a given society. Therefore, popular culture has a way of influencing an individual's attitudes towards certain topics. However, there are various ways to define pop culture. Because of this, popular culture is something that can be defined in a variety of conflicting ways by different people across different contexts. It is generally viewed in contrast to other forms of culture such as folk cults, working-class culture, or high culture, and also through different academic perspectives such as psychoanalysis, structuralism, postmodernism, and more. The common pop-culture categories are: entertainment (such as film, music, television and video games), sports, news (as in people/places in the news), politics, fashion, technology, and slang.

History

In the past folk culture functioned analogously to the popular culture of the masses and of the nations.

The phrase "popular culture" was coined in the 19th century or earlier. Traditionally, popular culture was associated with poor education and with the lower classes, as opposed to the "official culture" and higher education of the upper classes. 
 
With the rise of the Industrial Revolution in the eighteenth and nineteenth centuries, Britain experienced social changes that resulted in increased literacy rates, and with the rise of capitalism and industrialization, people began to spend more money on entertainment, such as (commercialised) pubs and sports. Reading also gained traction. Labelling penny dreadfuls the Victorian equivalent of video games, The Guardian in 2016 described penny fiction as "Britain's first taste of mass-produced popular culture for the young". A growing consumer culture and an increased capacity for travel via the newly invented railway (the first public railway, Stockton and Darlington Railway, opened in north-east England in 1825) created both a market for cheap popular literature, and the ability for its distribution on large scale. The first penny serials were published in the 1830s to meet the growing demand.

The stress in the distinction from "official culture" became more pronounced towards the end of the 19th century, a usage that became established by the interbellum period.

From the end of World War II, following major cultural and social changes brought by mass media innovations, the meaning of "popular culture" began to overlap with the connotations of "mass culture", "media culture", "image culture", "consumer culture", and "culture for mass consumption".

The abbreviated form "pop" for "popular", as in "pop music", dates from the late 1950s. Although the terms "pop" and "popular" are in some cases used interchangeably, and their meaning partially overlap, the term "pop" is narrower. Pop is specific to something containing qualities of mass appeal, while "popular" refers to what has gained popularity, regardless of its style.

Definition
According to author John Storey, there are various definitions of popular culture. The quantitative definition of culture has the problem that too much "high culture" (e.g., television dramatizations of Jane Austen) is also "popular." "Pop culture" is also defined as the culture that is "leftover" when we have decided what high culture is. However, many works straddle the boundaries, e.g., William Shakespeare and Charles Dickens, Leo Tolstoy, and George Orwell.

A third definition equates pop culture with "mass culture" and ideas. This is seen as a commercial culture, mass-produced for mass consumption by mass media. From a Western European perspective, this may be compared to American culture. Alternatively, "pop culture" can be defined as an "authentic" culture of the people, but this can be problematic as there are many ways of defining the "people." Storey argued that there is a political dimension to popular culture; neo-Gramscian hegemony theory "... sees popular culture as a site of struggle between the 'resistance' of subordinate groups in society and the forces of 'incorporation' operating in the interests of dominant groups in society." A postmodernist approach to popular culture would "no longer recognize the distinction between high and popular culture."

Jean Baudrillard argued that the vague conception "Public Opinion" is a subjective and inaccurate illusion which is more complicit in populism rather than in factuality, for it attributes a sovereignty to consumers that they do not really possess.

Storey claims that popular culture emerged from the urbanization of the Industrial Revolution. Studies of Shakespeare (by Weimann, Barber, or Bristol, for example) locate much of the characteristic vitality of his drama in its participation in Renaissance popular culture, while contemporary practitioners like Dario Fo and John McGrath use popular culture in its Gramscian sense that includes ancient folk traditions (the commedia dell'arte for example).

Popular culture is constantly evolving and occurs uniquely in place and time. It forms currents and eddies, and represents a complex of mutually interdependent perspectives and values that influence society and its institutions in various ways. For example, certain currents of pop culture may originate from, (or diverge into) a subculture, representing perspectives with which the mainstream popular culture has only limited familiarity. Items of popular culture most typically appeal to a broad spectrum of the public. Important contemporary contributions for understanding what popular culture means have been given by the German researcher Ronald Daus, who studies the impact of extra-European cultures in North America, Asia, and especially in Latin America.

Levels
Within the realm of popular culture, there exists an organizational culture. From its beginning, popular culture has revolved around classes in society and the push-back between them. Within popular culture, there are two levels that have emerged, high and low. High culture can be described as art and works considered of superior value, historically, aesthetically and socially. Low culture is regarded by some as that of the lower classes, historically.

Folklore

Adaptations based on traditional folklore provide a source of popular culture.
This early layer of cultural mainstream still persists today, in a form separate from mass-produced popular culture, propagating by word of mouth rather than via mass media, e.g. in the form of jokes or urban legends. With the widespread use of the Internet from the 1990s, the distinction between mass media and word-of-mouth has become blurred.

Although the folkloric element of popular culture engages heavily with the commercial element, communities amongst the public have their own tastes and they may not always embrace every cultural or subcultural item sold. Moreover, certain beliefs and opinions about the products of commercial culture may spread by word-of-mouth, and become modified in the process and in the same manner that folklore evolves.

Criticism 

Popular culture in the West has been critiqued for its being a system of commercialism that privileges products selected and mass-marketed by the upper-class capitalist elite; such criticisms are most notable in many Marxist theorists such as Herbert Marcuse, Theodor Adorno, Max Horkheimer, bell hooks, Antonio Gramsci, Guy Debord, Fredric Jameson, Terry Eagleton, as well as certain postmodern philosophers such as Jean-François Lyotard, who has written about the commercialisation of information under capitalism, and Jean Baudrillard, as well as others.

The Culture Industry

The most influential critiques of popular culture came from Marxist theorists of the Frankfurt School during the twentieth century. Theodor Adorno and Max Horkheimer analysed the dangers of the culture industry in their influential work the Dialectic of Enlightenment by drawing upon the works of Kant, Marx, Nietzsche and others. Capitalist popular culture, as Adorno argued, was not an authentic culture of the people but a system of homogenous and standardised products manufactured in the service of capitalist domination by the elite. The consumer demand for Hollywood films, pop tunes and consumable books is influenced by capitalist industries like Hollywood and the elite who decide which commodities are to be promoted in the media, including television and print journalism. Adorno wrote, "The industry bows to the vote it has itself rigged." It is the elite who commodify products in accordance with their narrow ideological values and criteria, and Adorno argues that the audience becomes accustomed to these formulaic conventions, making intellectual contemplation impossible. Adorno's work has had a considerable influence on culture studies, philosophy and the New Left. 

Writing in the New Yorker in 2014, music critic Alex Ross, argued that Adorno's work has a renewed importance in the digital age: "The pop hegemony is all but complete, its superstars dominating the media and wielding the economic might of tycoons...Culture appears more monolithic than ever, with a few gigantic corporations—Google, Apple, Facebook, Amazon—presiding over unprecedented monopolies." There is much scholarship on how Western entertainment industries strengthen transnational capitalism and reinforce a Western cultural dominance.  Hence, rather than being a local culture, commercial entertainment is artificially reinforced by transnational media corporations.  

Jack Zipes, a professor of German and literature, critiqued the mass commercialisation and corporate hegemony behind the Harry Potter franchise. He argued that the commodities of the culture industry are "popular" because they are homogenous and obey standard conventions; the media then influences the tastes of children. In his analysis of Harry Potter's global brand, Zipes wrote, "It must conform to the standards of exception set by the mass media and promoted by the culture industry in general. To be a phenomenon means that a person or commodity must conform to the hegemonic groups that determine what makes up a phenomenon".

Imperialism

According to John M. MacKenzie, many products of popular culture have been designed to promote imperialist ideologies and to glorify the British upper classes rather than present a democratic view of the world.  Although there are many films which do not contain such propaganda, there have been many films that promote racism and militarist imperialism.

Feminist critique
bell hooks, an influential feminist, argues that commercial commodities and celebrities cannot be symbols of progressiveness when they collaborate with imperialist capitalism and promote ideals of beauty; hooks uses Beyoncé as an example of a commodity reinforced by capitalist corporations complicit in imperialism and patriarchy.

Propaganda

Edward S. Herman and Noam Chomsky critiqued the mass media in their 1988 work Manufacturing Consent: The Political Economy of the Mass Media. They argue that mass media is controlled by a powerful hegemonic elite who are motivated by their own interests that determine and manipulate what information is present in the mainstream. The mass media is therefore a system of propaganda.

Consumerism

According to the postmodern sociologist Jean Baudrillard, the individual is trained into the duty of seeking the relentless maximisation of pleasure lest he or she become asocial. Therefore, "enjoyment" and "fun" become indistinguishable from the need to consume. Whereas the Frankfurt School believed consumers were passive, Baudrillard argued that consumers were trained to consume products in a form of active labour in order to achieve upward social mobility.  Thus, consumers under capitalism are trained to purchase products such as pop albums and consumable fiction in order to signal their devotion to social trends, fashions and subcultures. Although the consumption may arise from an active choice, the choice is still the consequence of a social conditioning which the individual is unconscious of. Baudrillard says, "One is permanently governed by a code whose rules and meaning-constraints—like those of language—are, for the most part, beyond the grasp of individuals."

In Baudrillard's understanding, the products of capitalist popular culture can only give the illusion of rebellion, since they are still complicit in a system controlled by the powerful. Baudrillard stated in an interview, critiquing the content and production of The Matrix:

Sources

Print culture

With the invention of the printing press in the sixteenth century, mass-produced, cheap books, pamphlets and periodicals became widely available to the public. With this, the transmission of common knowledge and ideas was possible.

Radio culture

In the 1890s, Nikola Tesla and Guglielmo Marconi created the radiotelegraph, allowing for the modern radio to be born. This led to the radio being able to influence a more "listened-to" culture, with individuals being able to feel like they have a more direct impact. This radio culture is vital, because it was imperative to advertising, and it introduced the commercial.

Films

Films and cinema are highly influential to popular culture, as films as an art form are what people seem to respond to the most. With moving pictures being first captured by Eadweard Muybridge in 1877, films have evolved into elements that can be cast into different digital formats, spreading to different cultures. 

The impact of films and cinema are most evident when analyzing in the search of what the films aim to portray. Films are used to seek acceptance and understanding of many subjects because of the influence the films carry—an example of an early representation of this can be seen in Casablanca (1942): the film introduced war subjects to the public after the United States entered World War II, and it meant to increase pro-war sentiment for the allies.  Films are a known massive influencer to popular culture yet not all films create a movement that contributes enough to be part of the popular culture that starts movements. The content must resonate to most of the public so the knowledge in the material connects with the majority. Popular culture is a set of beliefs in trends and entail to change a person's set of ideologies and create social transformation. The beliefs are still a trend that change more rapidly in the modern age that carries a continuation of outpouring media and more specifically films. The trend does not last but it also carries a different effect based on individuals that can be grouped to generalized groups based on age and education. The creation of culture by films is seen in fandoms, religions, ideologies, and movements. The culture of film is more evident through social media. Social media is an instant source of feedback and creates discussion on films.  A repeating event that has been set in modern culture within the trend setting phase is the creation of movements in social media platforms to defend a featured subject on a film.

Popular culture or mass culture, is reached easily with films which are easily shared and reached worldwide.

Television programs

A television program is a segment of audiovisual content intended for broadcast (other than a commercial, trailer, or other content not serving as attraction for viewership).

Television programs may be fictional (as in comedies and dramas), or non-fictional (as in documentary, light entertainment, news and reality television). They may be topical (as in the case of a local newscast and some made-for-television movies), or historical (as in the case of many documentaries and fictional series). They can be primarily instructional or educational, or entertaining as is the case in situation comedy and game shows.

Music

Popular music is music with wide appeal that is typically distributed to large audiences through the music industry. These forms and styles can be enjoyed and performed by people with little or no musical training. It stands in contrast to both art music and traditional or "folk" music. Art music was historically disseminated through the performances of written music, although since the beginning of the recording industry, it is also disseminated through recordings. Traditional music forms such as early blues songs or hymns were passed along orally, or to smaller, local audiences.

Sports

Sports include all forms of competitive physical activity or games which, through casual or organised participation, aim to use, maintain or improve physical ability and skills while providing enjoyment to participants, and in some cases, entertainment for spectators.

Corporate branding

Corporate branding refers to the practice of promoting the brand name of a corporate entity, as opposed to specific products or services.

Personal branding

Personal branding includes the use of social media to promotion to brands and topics to further good repute among professionals in a given field, produce an iconic relationship between a professional, a brand and its audience that extends networks past the conventional lines established by the mainstream and to enhance personal visibility. Popular culture: is generally recognized by members of a society as a set of the practices, beliefs, and objects that are dominant or prevalent in a society at a given point in time. As celebrities online identities are extremely important in order to create a brand to line-up sponsorships, jobs, and opportunities. As influencers, micro-celebrities, and users constantly need to find new ways to be unique or stay updated with trends, in order to maintain followers, views, and likes. For example, Ellen DeGeneres has created her own personal branding through her talk show The Ellen DeGeneres Show. As she developed her brand we can see the branches she created to extend her fan base such as Ellen clothing, socks, pet beds, and more.

Social media 

Social media is interactive computer-mediated technologies that facilitate the creation or sharing of information, ideas, career interests and other forms of expression via virtual communities and networks. Social media platforms such as Instagram, Facebook, Twitter, YouTube, TikTok and Snapchat are the most popular applications used on a daily basis for younger generations. Social media tends to be implemented into the daily routine of individuals in our current society. Social media is a vital part of our culture as it continues to impact the forms of communication used to connect with those in our communities, families, or friend groups. We often see that terms or slang is used online that is not used in face to face conversations, thus, adding to a persona users create through the screens of technology. For example, some individuals respond to situations with a hashtag or emojis.

See also

 Bread and circuses
 Cultural appropriation
 Culture industry
 Fads
 Journal of Popular Culture
 Lowbrow
 MTV Generation
 Pop art
 Pop icon
 Pop culture fiction
 Popular culture studies

Notes

References

 Ashby, LeRoy. "The Rising of Popular Culture: A Historiographical Sketch," OAH Magazine of History, 24 (April 2010), 11–14.
 Ashby, LeRoy. With Amusement for All: A History of American Popular Culture since 1830 (2006).
 : Der deutsche Pop-Roman. Die neuen Archivisten (The German Pop-Novel. The new archivists), C.H. Beck, München 2002, .
 Bakhtin, M. M. and Michael Holquist, Vadim Liapunov, Kenneth Brostrom (1981). The Dialogic Imagination: Four Essays (University of Texas Press Slavic Series). Ed. Michael Holquist. Trans. Caryl Emerson and Michael Holquist. Austin and London: University of Texas Press.
 Browne, Ray B. and Pat Browne, eds. The Guide to U.S. Popular Culture (2001), 1010 pages; essays by experts on many topics.
 Burke, Peter. "Popular Culture Reconsidered," Storia della Storiografia 1990, Issue 17, pp. 40–49.
 Freitag, Sandria B. "Popular Culture in the Rewriting of History: An Essay in Comparative History and Historiography," Journal of Peasant Studies, 1989, Vol. 16 Issue 3, pp. 169–198.
 Gans, Herbert J. Popular Culture and High Culture: an Analysis and Evaluation of Taste. New York: Basic Books, 1974. xii, 179 p. 
 Gerson, Stéphane. "' A World of Their Own': Searching for Popular Culture in the French Countryside," French Politics, Culture and Society, Summer 2009, Vol. 27 Issue 2, pp. 94–110
 Golby, J. M. and A.W. Purdue, The civilisation of the crowd: popular culture in England, 1750–1900 (1985) online
 Griffin, Emma. "Popular Culture in Industrializing England," Historical Journal, (2002) 45#3 pp. 619–635. online, Historiography
 Hassabian, Anahid (1999). "Popular", Key Terms in Popular Music and Culture, eds.: Horner, Bruce and Swiss, Thomas. Malden, Massachusetts: Blackwell Publishers. .
Kamaludeen Mohamed Nasir, 2016: Globalized Muslim Youth in the Asia Pacific: Popular Culture in Singapore and Sydney, New York: Palgrave. .
 Knight, Robert H. The Age of Consent: the Rise of Relativism and the Corruption of Popular Culture. Dallas, Tex.: Spence Publishing Co., 1998. xxiv, 253, [1] p. 
 Ross, Andrew. No Respect: Intellectuals & Popular Culture. New York: Routledge, 1989. ix, 269 p.  (pbk.)
 Seabrook, John. NoBrow : the culture of marketing the marketing of culture, New York: A.A. Knopf, 2000. .
 Storey, John (2006). Cultural theory and popular culture. Pearson Education. .
 
 Swirski, Peter (2010). Ars Americana Ars Politica: Partisan Expression in Contemporary American Literature and Culture.  Montreal, London: McGill-Queen's University Press.  .
 Swirski, Peter (2005). From Lowbrow to Nobrow.  Montreal, London: McGill-Queen's University Press.  .
 On Religion and Popular Culture

Further reading
 Duncan, Barry (1988). Mass Media and Popular Culture. Toronto, Ont.: Harcourt, Brace & Co. Canada. .
 Rosenberg, Bernard, and David Manning White, joint. eds. Mass Culture: the Popular Arts in America. [New York]: Free Press of Glencoe, 1957.
 Cowen, Tyler, "For Some Developing Countries, America's Popular Culture Is Resistible". The New York Times, 22 February 2007, sec. C, p. 3.
 Furio, Joanne, "The Significance of MTV and Rap Music in Popular Culture". The New York Times'', 29 December 1991, sec. VI, p. 2.

External links
 
 
 

 
Media studies
Youth